Data-oriented parsing (DOP, also data-oriented processing) is a probabilistic model in computational linguistics. DOP was conceived by Remko Scha in 1990 with the aim of developing a performance-oriented grammar framework. Unlike other probabilistic models, DOP takes into account all subtrees contained in a treebank rather than being restricted to, for example, 2-level subtrees (like PCFGs), thus allowing for more context-sensitive information.

Several variants of DOP have been developed. The initial version developed by Rens Bod in 1992 was based on tree-substitution grammar, while more recently, DOP has been combined with lexical-functional grammar (LFG). The resulting DOP-LFG finds an application in machine translation. Other work on learning and parameter estimation for DOP has also found its way into machine translation.

References

External links 
Remko Scha Research on DOP 
DOP Homepage 
Khalil Sima'an: Learning DOP models from treebanks; Computational Complexity
 Andy Way (1999). A hybrid architecture for robust MT using LFG-DOP. Journal of Experimental and Theoretical Artificial Intelligence 11(3):441–471.

Grammar frameworks
Natural language parsing